Diyungbra (IPA: Di-yung-bra [Diyung means Big river and bra means branch], etymological, River mouth of Diyung ; place where river Diyung and Kopili meets) is a newly created Sub-Division and an ITD Block  in Dima Hasao district in the Indian state of Assam. Diyungbra is also one of the three sub-divisions of Dima Hasao District.

Geography
Diyungbra is situated at bank of river Diyung and Kopili. The river Diyung that originates in Dima Hasao district joins river Kopili at Diyungbra. It is also called Diyungmukh or River mouth of Diyung by non-native speakers.

Literacy
Literacy rate in Diyungbra block is 53%. 9803 out of total 18352 population is educated here. Among males the literacy rate is 60% as 5651 males out of total 9415 are educated while female literacy rate is 46% as 4152 out of total 8937 females are literate in this Block.
The Negative portion is that illiteracy rate of Diyungbra block is 46%. Here 8549 out of total 18352 individuals are illiterate. Male illiteracy rate here is 39% as 3764 males out of total 9415 are illiterate. Among the females the illiteracy rate is 53% and 4785 out of total 8937 females are illiterate in this block

See also
List of subdivisions of Assam

References

Cities and towns in Dima Hasao district
Dima Hasao district